This article shows all participating team squads at the 1994 FIVB Women's World Championship, held from November 17 to 30 October in Brazil.

Head coach: Faik Karayev

Note: only a selection of 12 players listed below participated at the Championships

Head coach: Bernardo Rezende

Head coach: Li Xiaofeng
Note: only a selection of 11 players listed below participated at the Championships

Head coach: Eugenio George

Head coach: Milan Kanfka

Note: only a selection of 12 players listed below participated at the Championships

Head coach: Siegfried Kohler

Note: only a selection of 12 players listed below participated at the Championships

Head coach: Tadayoshi Yokota

Head coach: Aurelio Motta

Note: only a selection of 12 players listed below participated at the Championships

Head coach: Cilbert Ohanya

Note: only a selection of 12 players listed below participated at the Championships

Head coach: Chul-Yong Kim

Note: only a selection of 12 players listed below participated at the Championships

Head coach: Bert Goedkoop

Note: only a selection of 12 players listed below participated at the Championships

Head coach: Jong Park Dug

Head coach: Stan Gostinel

Head coach: Nikolai Karpol

Head coach: Volodimir Buzayev

Note: only a selection of 12 players listed below participated at the Championships

Head coach: Taras Liskevych

Note: only a selection of 12 players listed below participated at the Championships

References

S
FIVB Volleyball Women's World Championship squads